Gemelos sin cura is a 2017 Peruvian comedy film directed by Carlos Landeo and written by Liliana Alvarez. It stars Pablo "Melcochita" Villanueva in his acting debut in a film. It premiered on July 27, 2017 in Peruvian theaters.

Synopsis 
Pedro and Pablo are two twin brothers. Pedro is a canteen musician who dedicates himself to scamming and getting easy money. Pablo is a neighborhood priest, an honest man and somewhat shy. When Pedro is persecuted for a large debt, he goes to his brother's church to ask for help. Thus, both, due to different situations, will be forced to impersonate the other until they find solutions to their problems.

Cast 
The actors participating in this film are:

 Pablo "Melcochita" Villanueva as Pedro / Pablo
 Hernán Romero as Obispo Berrios
 Samuel Sunderland as Monaguillo Roberto
 Giovanna Varcárcel as Lieutenant Claudia Anaya

 Daniela Ramírez as Andrea

 Nico Ames as "El Tripa"

 Sergio Galliani as 'El Loco' Daniel

 Claudia Dammert as Hermana María

 Tatiana Espinoza as Carmen

 Nico Ames as El Tripa

 Ricardo Cabrera as Father Panchito

 Cindy Marino as Wendy

Production 
Filming began on March 20, 2017 and ended at the end of April of the same year.

Reception 
It was seen by 25,000 people on its first day in theaters. The film ended its run with a total of 311,892 viewers.

References

External links 

 

2017 films
2017 comedy films
Peruvian comedy films
Star Films films
2010s Peruvian films
2010s Spanish-language films
Films set in Peru
Films shot in Peru
Films about twin brothers
Films about religion